The IGEPv2 board is a low-power, fanless single-board computer based on the OMAP 3 series (also known as Cortex-A8) of ARM-compatible processors. It is developed and produced by Spanish corporation ISEE and is the second IGEP platform in the series.  The IGEPv2 is open hardware, licensed under a Creative Commons Attribution-Non Commercial-ShareAlike 3.0 unported license.

Board Specifications

 Package on package Memory/Processor
 Texas Instruments OMAP3530 or DM3730 multicore processor
 720 MHz (OMAP3530) or 1 GHz (DM3730) ARMv7 Cortex-A8 CPU
 NEON SIMD coprocessor
 110 MHz (OMAP3530) or 200 MHz (DM3730) Imagination Technologies PowerVR SGX530 graphics core
 IVA2.2 image, video, audio accelerator sub-system
 520 MHz (OMAP3530) or 800 MHz (DM3730) TMS320C64x+ DSP core
 512MB of NAND flash memory
 512MB of LPDDR SDRAM @ 200 MHz
 Peripheral connections
 Mini AB USB 2.0 OTG host/slave port
 Type A USB 2.0 host port
 DVI-D out port using HDMI connector
 microSD slot with support for SD and SDHC cards
 Integrated WiFi IEEE 802.11b/g and Bluetooth 2.0 antenna
 Ethernet 10/100 Mb port
 3.5mm standard stereo in and out jacks
 Power
 5 V via 3.5 mm barrel DC connector (AC adapter available)
 JST connector also supported
 Other Expansions
 Two bicolor user programmable LEDs
 RS-485 with transceiver
 UART, McBSP, McSPI, I2C, GPIO
 Keyboard button matrix
 Debug
 Console RS-232 port
 JTAG interface
 Dimensions: 93x65 mm (3.6x2.5 inches)

Similar products
Beagle Board - OMAP board from Texas Instruments and Digikey
OpenPandora - handheld game console that uses Texas Instruments OMAP3530 and DM3730
Gumstix overo - a similar single-board computer package that uses the OMAP3503 and the OMAP3530
OSWALD - OMAP3530 application developed by Oregon State University students for computer science education
EBVBeagle Board - Beagle Board clone from EBV Elektronik.
Empower Technologies's EMP3503 and EMP3530 - OMAP35x based single-board computers
FOX Board - a complete Linux system in just 66 x 72 mm, not OMAP based

See also
Texas Instruments TMS320
OmapZoom
OpenEmbedded

External links
 IGEPv2 Board product page
 ISEE Official Website
 ISEE Online Store
 IGEPv2 Hardware Reference Manual
 Texas Instruments OMAP3530 Applications Processor product page
 Texas Instruments DM3730 Digital Media Processor product page

References

Single-board computers